Juniper Networks, Inc. is an information technology and computer networking products multinational company, founded in 1996.

By 2001, Juniper had made only a few acquisitions of smaller companies, due to the leadership's preference for organic growth. The pace of acquisition picked up in 2001 and 2002 with the purchases of Pacific Broadband and Unisphere Networks. In 2004 Juniper made a $4 billion acquisition of network security company NetScreen Technologies. Juniper revised NetScreen's channel program that year and used its reseller network to bring other products to market.

Juniper made five acquisitions in 2005, mostly of startups with deal values ranging from $8.7 to $337 million. It acquired application-acceleration vendor Redline Networks, VOIP company Kagoor Networks, as well as wide area network (WAN) company Peribit Networks. Peribit and Redline were incorporated into a new application products group and their technology was integrated into Juniper's infranet framework.

From 2010 to September 2011, Juniper made six acquisitions and invested in eight companies. Often Juniper acquired early-stage startups, developing their technology, than selling it to pre-existing Juniper clients. Juniper acquired two digital video companies, Ankeena Networks and Blackwave Inc., as well as wireless LAN software company Trapeze Networks. In 2012, Juniper acquired Mykonos Software, which develops security software intended to deceive hackers already within the network perimeter. and a developer of software-defined network controllers, Contrail Systems. In 2014 Juniper acquired the software-defined networking (SDN) company WANDL.



Acquisitions

Acquisitions summary 
Juniper Networks, Inc. has made 22 acquisitions, although it has not taken stake in any companies. Juniper made 1 divestiture in 2006.

References

Juniper Networks
Juniper Networks
Juniper